The jazz album Notorious Tourist from the East was recorded by Toshiko Akiyoshi in 1978 and released in the USA on the Inner City Record label and in Japan on the Discomate record label (as Toshiko Plays Toshiko, not to be confused with the 1996 Nippon Crown recording, Time Stream: Toshiko Plays Toshiko).

Track listing
Side 'A'
"Notorious Tourist from the East"
"Soliloquy"
Side 'B'
"Hangin' Loose"
"Memory"
"After Mr. Teng"
All songs composed by Toshiko Akiyoshi

Personnel
Toshiko Akiyoshi – piano
Steven Huffsteter – trumpet
Gene Cherico – bass
Billy Higgins – drums

References / external links
Discomate DSP-5014
Inner City IC 6066
[ Allmusic]

References

Toshiko Akiyoshi albums
1979 albums